The East German Republic Day Parade of 1988 was a parade on Karl-Marx-Allee in East Berlin on October 7, 1988 commemorating the 39th anniversary of the establishment of East Germany. Minister of Defense of the GDR Army General Heinz Kessler inspected the parade and Colonel General Horst Stechbarth commanded the parade as the Deputy Minister of Defense. The leader of East Germany Erich Honecker and the Prime Minister of the GDR Willi Stoph attended the parade. The Central Band of the National People's Army performed the military marches.

Gallery

External links

References 

Military parades in East Germany
1988 in East Germany
October 1988 events in Europe